Angus Ross (18 April 1953 – 17 January 2016) was a Scottish professional darts player who competed in the 1970s and 1980s.

Biography

Ross represented Scotland with captain Rab Smith and Jocky Wilson in the 1981 BDO Nations Cup. In the final with Scotland and England tied at 4–4, Ross defeated Cliff Lazarenko in the deciding leg to clinch the trophy 5-4 for the Scots.

He competed in the 1981 BDO World Darts Championship, losing in the first round to John Lowe. He then played in the 1982 BDO World Darts Championship and defeated former world champion Leighton Rees 2–0 in the first round, but was defeated by Australian Terry O'Dea 0–2 in the second round.

Ross once appeared on the quiz show Bullseye, where he achieved a score of 179 from nine darts.

Ross died from pancreatic cancer in January 2016 at the age of 62.

World Championship results

BDO

 1981: 1st Round (lost to John Lowe 0–2)
 1982: 2nd Round (lost to Terry O'Dea 0–2)

References

External links
Profile and stats on Darts Database

1953 births
2016 deaths
British Darts Organisation players
Sportspeople from Kilmarnock
Scottish darts players
Deaths from pancreatic cancer